James Reid (November 14, 1839 – November 15, 1915) was a Canadian politician.

Born in Charlo Station, New Brunswick, he was elected to the House of Commons of Canada for Restigouche in the 1900 federal election. A Liberal, he was re-elected in 1904, 1908, and 1911. He died while in office in 1915.

References
 

1839 births
1915 deaths
Liberal Party of Canada MPs
Members of the House of Commons of Canada from New Brunswick